Sicilia was the second of three  ironclad battleships built for the Italian Regia Marina (Royal Navy). The ship, named for the island of Sicily, was laid down in Venice in November 1884, launched in July 1891, and completed in May 1895.

Sicilia spent the first decade of her career in the Active Squadron of the Italian fleet. Thereafter, she was transferred to the Reserve Squadron, and by 1911, she was part of the Training Division. She took part in the Italo-Turkish War of 1911–1912, where she escorted convoys to North Africa and supported Italian forces ashore by bombarding Ottoman troops. She was thereafter used as a depot ship for the new dreadnought battleship . During World War I, she continued in service as a depot ship, and later in the war she was converted into a repair ship. Sicilia was stricken in 1923 and subsequently broken up for scrap.

Design

The ship had an inverted bow with a ram below the waterline. She was fitted with a single military mast located amidships, which had fighting tops for some of the light guns. The ship's superstructure included a conning tower forward and a secondary conning tower further aft. She had a crew of 736 officers and men.

Her propulsion system consisted of a pair of vertical compound steam engines each driving a single screw propeller, with steam supplied by eighteen coal-fired, cylindrical fire-tube boilers. The boilers were vented through three funnels, two placed side by side just aft of the conning tower and the third much further aft.

Sicilia was armed with a main battery of four  30-caliber guns, mounted in two twin-gun turrets, one on either end of the ship. She carried a secondary battery of eight  40-cal. guns placed singly in shielded mounts atop the upper deck, with four on each broadside. Close-range defense against torpedo boats was provided by a battery of sixteen  guns in casemates in the upper deck, eight on each broadside. These were supported by twenty  43-cal. guns and ten  guns. As was customary for capital ships of the period, she carried five  torpedo tubes in above-water launchers. 

The ship was lightly armored for her size.

Service history

Sicilia was named after the island of Sicily. She was built by the Venetian Arsenal in Venice. Her keel was laid down on 3 November 1884, and her completed hull was launched on 6 July 1891. At her launching ceremony, the new ship was christened by Queen Margherita. Fitting-out work was completed on 4 May 1895, after which the ship entered service with the Italian fleet.

In February 1897, Sicilia arrived off Crete to serve in the International Squadron, a multinational force made up of ships of the Austro-Hungarian Navy, French Navy, Imperial German Navy, Regia Marina, Imperial Russian Navy, and British Royal Navy that intervened in the 1897–1898 Greek uprising on Crete against rule by the Ottoman Empire.

By 1899, Sicilia had been assigned to the 2nd Division. For 1903, the Active Squadron was on active service for seven months, with the rest of the year spent with reduced crews. In 1904–1905, Sicilia and her sisters were still in service with the Active Squadron, which was kept in service for nine months of the year, with three months in reduced commission. The following year, the ships were transferred to the Reserve Squadron, along with the three s and the ironclad , three cruisers, and sixteen torpedo boats. This squadron only entered active service for two months of the year for training maneuvers, and the rest of the year was spent with reduced crews. Sicilia was still in the Reserve Squadron in 1908, along with her two sisters and the two s. By this time, the Reserve Squadron was kept in service for seven months of the year.

Italo-Turkish War

On 29 September 1911, Italy declared war on the Ottoman Empire in order to seize Libya. At the time, Sicilia and her two sisters were assigned to the Training Division, along with the old armored cruiser , with Sicilia serving as the flagship of Rear Admiral Raffaele Borea Ricci D'Olmo. On 3–4 October, Sicilia and her sisters were tasked with bombarding Fort Sultanje, which was protecting the western approach to Tripoli. The ships used their 6-inch guns to attack the fort to preserve their stock of 13.5-inch shells. By the morning of the 4th, the ships' gunfire had silenced the guns in the fort, allowing landing forces to go ashore and capture the city. These included a contingent led by Sicilias captain. The ships of the Training Division thereafter alternated between Tripoli and Khoms to support the Italian garrisons in the two cities; this included repulsing a major Ottoman attack on Tripoli over 23–26 October, where Sicilia and Sardegna supported the Italian left flank against concerted Ottoman assaults. In November, Sicilia, Re Umberto, the torpedo cruiser Partenope, the destroyer , and the torpedo boat  bombarded the oasis at Taguira, though no Turkish forces were present. The Italians then sent a garrison to protect the oasis.

Sicilia and her sisters arrived back in La Spezia, where they had their ammunition and supplies replenished. In May 1912, the Training Division patrolled the coast, but saw no action. The following month, Sicilia and her sisters, along with six torpedo boats, escorted a convoy carrying an infantry brigade to Buscheifa, one of the last ports in Libya still under Ottoman control. The Italian force arrived off the town on 14 June and made a landing; after taking the city, the Italian forces then moved on to Misrata. Sicilia and the rest of the ships continued supporting the advance until the Italians had secured the city on 20 July. The Training Division then returned to Italy, where they joined the escort for another convoy on 3 August, this time to Zuara, the last port in Ottoman hands. The ships covered the landing two miles east of Zuara two days later, which was joined by supporting attacks from the west and south. With the capture of the city, Italy now controlled the entire Libyan coast. On 14 October the Ottomans agreed to sign a peace treaty to end the war.

Later career
Sicilia became a depot ship for the new dreadnought battleship , which was then nearing completion at Taranto. Sicilia was stricken on 9 July 1914 and slated to be scrapped, but the Regia Marina decided to retain the ship after World War I broke out at the end of the month. On 16 August 1914, the ship was disarmed and returned to service as a depot ship in Taranto for ammunition and sailors. Italy had declared neutrality at the start of World War I, but by May 1915, the Triple Entente had convinced the Italians to enter the war against the Central Powers. Later in the war, Sicilia was converted into a repair ship. The ship was stricken again in 1923 and thereafter broken up for scrap.

Footnotes

References
 
 Brassey, Thomas A., ed. (1899). The Naval Annual (Portsmouth: J. Griffin & Co.).
 
 
 Brassey, Thomas A., ed. (1908). The Naval Annual (Portsmouth: J. Griffin & Co.).
 
 
 
 
 Robinson, Charles N., ed. (1897). The Navy and Army Illustrated (London: Hudson & Kearns) III (32).

Further reading

External links

 Sicilia (1891) Marina Militare website

Re Umberto-class battleships
World War I battleships of Italy
1891 ships
Ships built by the Venetian Arsenal